A tobacco display ban, point-of-sale display ban or retail display ban is a measure imposed in some jurisdictions prohibiting shops and stores from displaying tobacco products.

Tobacco display bans are in place in several countries and regions: Australia, Canada, Croatia, Finland, Iceland, Ireland, Macao, New Zealand, the Netherlands, Norway, Russia, Singapore, Thailand, and the United Kingdom. The implementation differs, but the ban in most jurisdictions mandates that shops and stores that sell tobacco products keep the products out of sight of customers, under the counter, or in special cabinets. Tobacco products can only be shown on request from customers. The idea behind the regulation is that people would be less inclined to smoke if they can not see the products.

Effects
The long term effects of these policies cannot be proven as insufficient evidence currently exists.  Some studies have been undertaken and others are ongoing.

Opponents of tobacco display bans claim that the regulations have caused shops to close as a result of costs associated with the ban, and that the bans have caused the proportion of illegal or 'contraband' cigarettes sold to increase. Following the 2007 ban in Canada, in the span of 2-3 years a reduction of 5% of illegal cigarettes was observed: 20.7 per cent of cigarettes sold in 2010 were illegal (down from 25.1% in 2008),  and 15 per cent of convenience stores have closed.
In Iceland 30 per cent of smaller shops have closed.  It is not yet clear whether the shop closures were linked to the tobacco display ban or the significant  wider economic issues affecting Iceland during the period in question.

Proponents of tobacco display bans argue that some of the stores have closed for other reasons, such as the prevailing economic conditions or a downward  trend in smoking levels.  Proponents point to the lack of evidence to prove significant negative unintended consequences.  They note that the few studies that have been undertaken at best show a correlation between certain trends, but stress that does not prove causation between the ban and alleged increases in shop closures, nor smoking levels.

In the August 2010 issue of Pediatrics it is argued that young people who visit tobacco stores frequently smoke more often than their peers.

Jurisdictions with tobacco display bans

See also
Tobacco-Free Pharmacies - A similar more worldwide movement 
Plain tobacco packaging

References

Tobacco control